The  is a museum dedicated to Cormorant Fishing on the Nagara River and located in the city of Gifu, Gifu Prefecture, Japan. In addition to viewing artifacts from the history of cormorant fishing, visitors can also view the cormorants actually used in the process. The museum is run by the cormorant fishing masters, who are Imperial Agents of the Royal Household Agency.

Facilities information
Hours of operation
8:30am to 5:00pm
Holidays
2nd and 4th Sundays
Mondays (Tuesday, if Monday is a holiday)
Dec. 31 to Jan. 4
Entrance fee
Free

Access
From JR Gifu Station (Bus Platform 11) or Meitetsu Gifu Station (Bus Platform 4), board any Gifu Bus towards Nagara. Get off the bus at "Ukai-ya," approximately 15 minutes from the train stations. The museum is a  walk up river from there.

References

Buildings and structures in Gifu
Museums in Gifu Prefecture
Maritime museums in Japan
Cormorants
Fishing museums
Fishing in Japan